In baseball, hitting for the cycle is the accomplishment of one batter who hits a single, a double, a triple, and a home run in the same game. Collecting the hits in that order is known as a "natural cycle". Cycles are rare in Major League Baseball (MLB), having occurred only 339 times, starting with Curry Foley in 1882. The most recent cycle was accomplished by Nolan Arenado of the St. Louis Cardinals on July 1, 2022, against the Philadelphia Phillies. The Miami Marlins are the only current MLB franchise who have never had a player hit for the cycle.

Rarity
The cycle is about as uncommon as a no-hitter; it has been called "one of the rarest" and "most difficult feats" in baseball. Based on 2009 offensive levels, the probability of an average MLB player hitting for a cycle against an average team in a game is about 0.0059%; this corresponds to about 2 cycles in a 162-game season with 30 teams. The most cycles hit in a single major league season is eight, which occurred in both 1933 and 2009.

In other baseball leagues, the cycle is achieved less frequently. Through June 2022, there have been 76 cycles hit in Nippon Professional Baseball (NPB), the top-level baseball organization in Japan, most recently by Yasutaka Shiomi on September 18, 2021.One NPB player, Atsuya Furuta, has hit for the cycle in an NPB All-Star game. No player has ever hit for the cycle in the MLB All-Star Game. One MLB player has hit for the cycle in a postseason game: Brock Holt of the Boston Red Sox in Game 3 of the 2018 ALDS.

Two players have hit for the cycle on the same day once in NPB history; this has occurred twice in MLB history. There have never been multiple cycles completed in a single MLB or NPB game; this is known to have occurred twice in Minor League Baseball: on April 11, 2018, by Gio Brusa and Jalen Miller of the Class A-Advanced San Jose Giants, and on August 7, 2018, by Kevin Newman and Jacob Stallings of the Triple-A Indianapolis Indians.

Components

Single
Under Major League Baseball Rule 6.09(a), the "batter becomes a runner when he hits a fair ball". The single—in which the batter reaches first base without being put out, and without the benefit of a fielding error—is the most common type of hit in baseball: for example, there were 25,838 singles hit during the 1988 MLB season, compared to 6,386 doubles, 840 triples, or 3,180 home runs. The MLB leader in singles is Pete Rose, who is also the league's all-time hit leader. The single-season leader in singles is Ichiro Suzuki, who broke Willie Keeler's 106-year-old record in 2004 by notching 225, 19 more than the previous record. None of the top five players in singles (Rose, Ty Cobb, Eddie Collins, Cap Anson, and Keeler) in MLB history have hit for the cycle; of those five, only Rose had more than 150 home runs, and two (Collins and Keeler), who both played during the dead-ball era, had fewer than 50, lessening the probability of their completing the cycle.

Double
A double is a hit in which the batter reaches second base without being put out, and without the benefit of a fielding error. This scenario often occurs when a ball is hit into the gaps between the outfielders, or down the foul line on either side of the playing field. Tris Speaker is the all-time leader in doubles in MLB history, with 792, one of which was part of a cycle; Speaker accomplished the feat for the Boston Red Sox on June 9, 1912, against the St. Louis Browns. Two of the other top five players in MLB history in doubles have hit for the cycle: Stan Musial (725 doubles; third all-time) completed the cycle on July 24, 1949; and Craig Biggio (668; fifth all-time) accomplished the feat on April 8, 2002. The single-season MLB leader is Earl Webb, the left-handed outfielder who hit 67 in 1931.

Triple

The triple, in which the batter reaches third base without being put out and without the benefit of a fielding error, is often called the "hardest part of the cycle" to complete. Triples are often hit to the same areas as doubles, but may require impressive speed by the runner. It is rare to see a player with slower-than-average running speed complete the cycle, but it has happened, such as when catcher Bengie Molina hit for the cycle on July 16, 2010; Molina described himself as "the [slowest] guy in baseball" earlier that season. The MLB all-time leader in triples is Sam Crawford, with 309; he never hit for the cycle. Of the top five players in MLB history in triples, two have hit for the cycle:  Honus Wagner in 1912 and Roger Connor in 1890. Chief Wilson hit for the cycle in 1910, two years before he hit for a record 36 triples in a single season.

Home run
A home run is a hit in which the batter reaches home plate, scoring a run on the same play without being put out, and without the benefit of a fielding error. Most often in modern baseball, this occurs when the batter hits the ball over the outfield wall in fair territory.  Home-run hitters are commonly believed to be larger, slower players due to their strength, and may not be fast enough to complete the triple. The MLB single-season and all-time leader in home runs is Barry Bonds, who hit 73 home runs in the 2001 season and notched 762 in his 22-season career. Bonds never hit for the cycle. Among the MLB leaders in career home runs, the highest-ranking player with a cycle is Alex Rodriguez (fifth all-time; retired in 2016 with 696 home runs), who hit for the cycle on June 5, 1997. Home runs can also occur on a batted ball that does not leave the field of play; this is called an inside-the-park home run. Inside-the-park home runs are rare, and no player has hit one as part of a cycle since 1943.

Accomplishments

Major League Baseball

Multiple cycles

The most career cycles hit by an MLB player is three, accomplished by six players:

All of Beltré's cycles occurred at Globe Life Park in Arlington; he is the only player to hit for the cycle with different teams in the same ballpark.
All of Yelich's cycles were hit against the Cincinnati Reds; he is the only player to hit for the cycle three times against the same team.

Forty-four players have hit for the cycle at least twice. Five have hit for the cycle twice in one season:

One player has hit for the cycle twice against the same team in one season: Christian Yelich against the Cincinnati Reds in 2018.
 
Cycles have occurred on the same day twice in MLB history; on September 17, 1920, by Bobby Veach of the Detroit Tigers and George Burns of the New York Giants; and on September 1, 2008, by the Arizona Diamondbacks' Stephen Drew and the Seattle Mariners' Adrián Beltré. The longest period of time between two players hitting for the cycle was 5 years, 1 month, and 10 days, a drought lasting from Bill Joyce cycle in 1896 to Harry Davis in 1901.

Natural cycles
The natural cycle, in which the hits come in order from fewest to most total bases (single, double, triple, home run), has been accomplished 15 times in MLB history:

Reverse cycles
The natural cycle has been accomplished in reverse (home run, triple, double, single)—also known as an "unnatural" cycle—ten times:

Other accomplishments

Nine players have hit a grand slam as part of their cycle:

Six players have had a walk-off home run as the final hit of their cycles:

Ten players have collected six hits in the game in which they hit their cycle. Only three of these—by Larry Twitchell, Sam Thompson, and Ian Kinsler—were accomplished in a nine-inning game in the American League or National League.

 indicates an extra-innings game (Yelich collected his six hits in the first nine innings of a 10-inning game.)

Kinsler's six-hit cycle came on Jackie Robinson Day, honoring the African-American pioneer who had hit for the cycle in 1948.

The most recent player to hit for the cycle with an inside-the-park home run was Leon Culberson in 1943.

The earliest in a game that a cycle has been completed is the fourth inning, accomplished by Mike Lansing of the Colorado Rockies on June 18, 2000, when he had a first-inning triple, second-inning homer, third-inning double, and fourth-inning single.

Four batters hit for the cycle in the same season in which they won the Triple Crown; Nap Lajoie (AL, 1901), Jimmie Foxx (AL, 1933), Chuck Klein (NL, 1933), and Lou Gehrig (AL, 1934). Gehrig is the only player to complete the MLB Triple Crown in his cycle-hitting season, leading both leagues in batting average, home runs, and runs batted in.

Five players have hit for the cycle in the same season in which they won a Most Valuable Player (MVP) award; Jimmie Foxx in 1933, Ted Williams in 1946, Mickey Mantle in 1957, and both Mookie Betts and Christian Yelich in 2018.

Three players — John Olerud, Michael Cuddyer, and Bob Watson — have hit for the cycle in both the National League and American League.

Three family pairs have hit for the cycle; father and son Gary Ward (1980) and Daryle Ward (2004), grandfather and grandson Gus Bell (1951) and David Bell (2004), and father and son Craig Biggio (2002) and Cavan Biggio (2019).

Two players have hit cycles both for and against the same team; Joe Cronin against (1929) and for (1940) the Red Sox, and Adrián Beltré against (2008) and for (2012, 2015) the Rangers.

One player, Brock Holt of the Boston Red Sox, hit for the cycle in a postseason game: Game 3 of the 2018 ALDS, on October 8, 2018, against the New York Yankees at Yankee Stadium.

On September 19, 2021, Eddie Rosario of the Atlanta Braves hit for the cycle on five pitches, the smallest number since at least 1900.

Nippon Professional Baseball

Multiple cycles

During his eight seasons playing for the Yokohama BayStars, Bobby Rose hit for three cycles, the most of any Nippon Professional Baseball player. Spaced two seasons apart, his first cycle occurred on May 2, 1995, the next on April 29, 1997, and his final cycle on June 30, 1999. Three NPB players have hit for the cycle twice; Fumio Fujimura (both with the Osaka Tigers), Hiromi Matsunaga (both with the Hankyu/Orix Braves), and Kosuke Fukudome (one with the Chunichi Dragons, and one with the Hanshin Tigers). Fujimura is also the only player to have hit a cycle during both the single league era and the current dual league era.

The 2003 NPB season saw the most cycles hit in a single season—five. That season also saw the only instance of cycles occurring on the same day: on July 1, hit by Atsunori Inaba of the Yakult Swallows and Arihito Muramatsu of the Fukuoka Daiei Hawks. The next day, Shinjiro Hiyama became the third player to hit for the cycle in two days. Conversely, the longest period of time between two players hitting for the cycle was 5 years, 11 months, and 30 days, a drought lasting from Michihiro Ogasawara cycle in 2008 to Rainel Rosario in 2014.

Natural cycles
The natural cycle has been accomplished five times in NPB history. Fumio Fujimura's second cycle on May 25, 1950, was the first time a player collected the hits in order. On average, the natural cycle occurs approximately every 13 years. Other than Fujimura, the four players to hit for the natural cycle are Kazuhiko Kondo in 1961, Takahiro Tokutsu in 1976, Takanori Okamura in 1985, and Muramatsu in 2003. The natural cycle has been accomplished in reverse by Alex Ochoa (2004) and Rosario (2014).

Other related accomplishments
When Ochoa hit his cycle with the Chunichi Dragons on April 13, 2004, he became the only player to hit a cycle in both Major League Baseball and Nippon Professional Baseball. Eight years earlier, Ochoa had accomplished the same feat on July 3, 1996, while playing for MLB's New York Mets. Yakult Swallows catcher Atsuya Furuta is the only player to hit for the cycle in an NPB All-Star game, doing so in game 2 of the 1992 series. Inaba is the only player to hit for the cycle in a rain-shortened game. After hitting a triple in the first inning and hitting a home run in the fourth, Inaba collected the other two necessary hits in a seven-run fifth inning when the order batted around. Kosuke Fukudome is the only player to have hit a grand slam as the home run of the cycle. Hiroshi Ohshita and Kazuhiko Kondo are the only two players to have hit a walk-off home run to win the game as the final hit of their cycles.

KBO League

Multiple cycles 
Eric Thames hit for the cycle twice during the 2015 season of the KBO League.

See also
 Home run cycle, when a player hits a solo home run, two-run home run, three-run home run, and grand slam all in one game

References

External links

Cycle records at MLB.com
Cycle records at Retrosheet
Cycle records at Baseball Almanac

Baseball terminology